Milica Radunović (born 9 November 1996) is a Montenegrin footballer who plays as a defender for the Montenegro women's national team.

International career
Radunović capped for Montenegro at senior level during the UEFA Women's Euro 2017 qualifying Group 2, in a 1–7 home loss to Finland on 12 April 2016.

References

1996 births
Living people
Women's association football defenders
Montenegrin women's footballers
Montenegro women's international footballers